The United States Premier Hockey League (USPHL) is an American ice hockey league. Founded in 2012, the USPHL has grown to over 60 organizations from across the United States fielding teams in the National Collegiate Development Conference (NCDC), Premier, Elite, EHF, 18U, 16U, 15U, and High Performance youth divisions.

From 2013 to 2017, USA Hockey sanctioned the Premier, Elite, Empire, Midwest, and USP3 Divisions as Tier III junior leagues. In 2017, the USPHL added a higher level junior league named the National Collegiate Development Conference (NCDC) for the 2017–18 season. The NCDC was seeking free-to-play Tier II junior league sanctioning, but was denied by USA Hockey. In response, the USPHL junior level leagues withdrew from USA Hockey sanctioning altogether. The 18U, 16U and 15U divisions are still considered Tier I youth hockey divisions by USA Hockey.

History

Establishment (2013–2017)
During the 2012–13 season, several organizations within the Eastern Junior Hockey League (EJHL) decided to form their own league and created the United States Premier Hockey League (USPHL). Those organizations also added their youth programs under the USPHL name as the 18U and 16U divisions. The original Tier III junior teams were categorized in the Premier Division when the USPHL absorbed the Empire Junior Hockey League (becoming the Empire Division) and the newly formed Eastern Elite Hockey League (becoming the Elite Division). With the additions, the USPHL added 16 more organizations to the original 15 before the inaugural 2013–14 season. The formation of the USPHL also led the remaining EJHL teams to join the Atlantic Junior Hockey League and create the Eastern Hockey League (EHL).

For the league's second season in 2014–15, the USPHL added the 16U Futures (16UF) Division for players who aspire to play midget hockey, but are not yet ready for the 16U Division. Eight organizations fielded teams in the 16UF Division for its first season. During the 2014 off-season the USPHL lost the New York Applecore (Empire), but added the Providence Capitals (Elite & 16U), Jersey Shore Whalers (Empire), and the Richmond Generals (Elite, Empire) organizations to increase the total number of organizations to 35 headed into the 2014–15 season.

During the 2014–15 season, the USPHL announce the creation of a Midwest Division to begin in the 2015–16 season by adding several teams from the Minnesota Junior Hockey League (MnJHL). By the end of the season, the Midwest Division would add all but one active MnJHL team causing the MnJHL to disband for the following season. On March 10, 2015, the USPHL also added the entire Midwest Junior Hockey League to its new Midwest Division for the 2015–16 season. USPHL Midwest became the fourth Tier III division under the USPHL umbrella.

The changes for the 2015–16 continued into April when the New York Aviators announced their decision to leave the USPHL and join the North American 3 Eastern Hockey League (NA3EHL). The USPHL promptly reassigned the Aviator franchise to Rye, New York, and was renamed to the New York Dragons. In early April 2015, the Empire Division would expand to Daytona, Florida with the Daytona Racers. Also in April, it was announced the Empire Division would be renamed as the USP3 Division. In late April 2015, the Charlotte Rush was announced as an expansion franchise by adding two teams, one in the Elite Division and one in the USP3. The Wooster Oilers from the former MnJHL decided against fielding two Tier III teams and dropped their membership in the USPHL Midwest and would only play in the North American 3 Hockey League. Initially announced with 22 member teams, the new Midwest Division saw a number of teams cease operations prior to the 2015–16 season including the Indiana Attack, Ironwood Fighting Yoopers, Minnesota Owls, Soo Firehawks, and St. Louis Storm due to lack of players. The Midwest Division did not have its own championship playoffs, but instead the top two teams in each conference from the Midwest and USP3 Divisions played for a single championship.

On January 14, 2016, the league announced the formation of a High Performance Youth Division for the upcoming 2016–17 season. The new division added 14 and under (Bantams), 12 and under (Peewees), along with 10 and under (Squirts) to the USPHL umbrella. Charter members of the High Performance Youth Division were to include the New Jersey Rockets, Hartford Junior Wolfpack, Jersey Hitmen, and P.A.L. Jr. Islanders. In late April, the USPHL announced that the Elite and USP3 Divisions were expanding by splitting the teams from the one-year-old Midwest Division into the Elite and USP3 platforms. More changes came on May 20, 2016, when the USPHL added the four remaining teams from the former Northern Pacific Hockey League to the USP3 as a Pacific Division. Before the start of the season, the loss of the Illiana Blackbirds (Elite), Michigan Wild (USP3), and Marquette Royales (USP3) was offset by the additions of Team Beijing (Elite), another team from the New York Aviators organization (Elite), and the return of the Ironwood Fighting Yoopers (USP3).

League realignment (2017–present)
In October 2016, the USPHL announced it had applied to USA Hockey for approval to start a Tier II junior league for the 2017–18 season. The proposed Tier II USPHL division was announced to consist of 11 teams, seven from organizations in the USPHL Premier, the newly added Rochester Monarchs, and the Boston Bandits, New Jersey Rockets, and Northern Cyclones from the Eastern Hockey League. At the time, the only USA Hockey-sanctioned Tier II league is the North American Hockey League. However, in December 2016, USA Hockey denied their application for a Tier II league. The USPHL launched its tuition-free league as the National Collegiate Development Conference. In response, the USPHL dropped USA Hockey sanctioning from their junior level leagues and operates unsanctioned beginning with the 2017–18 season.

In December 2016, the USPHL also announced the addition of six organizations from the Eastern Hockey League for the 2017–18 season: the previously mentioned Bandits, Rockets, and Cyclones would be joined by the Connecticut Nighthawks, Hartford Jr. Wolfpack, and New Hampshire Junior Monarchs. The New Hampshire Monarchs previously fielded USPHL teams in the youth levels. While the Bandits, Rockets and Cyclones have free-to-play teams in the new NCDC, all six organizations were announced to have Tier III teams in the Premier Division and five teams in the Elite Division. The Jr. Monarchs would also add a NCDC team in 2018.

The league also announced the retirement of the USP3 Division, with the Premier Division remaining the top pay-to-play division and the Elite Division the only Tier III feeder division. The Jersey Shore Whalers and the Florida Jr. Blades, both members of the former USP3 Division, were granted teams in the Premier Division, as well as the Jr. Blades adding their USP3 team to the Elite Division. The Skipjacks Hockey Club also added a Premier team to augment their teams in the youth divisions. The Wisconsin Muskies also announced they would field an expansion team in the Premier Division. As part of the many changes, three of the four isolated former USP3 Pacific Division teams left the league with only the Eugene Generals remaining. The Generals would have a modified schedule for the season in the Elite Division playing most of their games against local youth and academy teams while only playing other USPHL teams in showcases.

For 2018–19, the league merged with the Eastern Hockey Federation (EHF) youth leagues. The EHF organization already had many of the USPHL's junior organization's youth clubs. The league also rebranded its 16U Futures as 15U. On March 8, 2019, the USPHL and EHF announced plans to integrate the USPHL's High Performance Youth Division into the EHF to create the EHF South Division, expanding the youth league's footprint into the Mid-Atlantic region, beginning with the 2019–20 season.

In 2020, the USPHL Premier added the Anaheim Avalanche, Fresno Monsters, Las Vegas Thunderbirds, Northern Colorado Eagles, Ogden Mustangs, Pueblo Bulls, San Diego Sabers, Southern Oregon Spartans, and the Utah Outliers from the Western States Hockey League, another independent junior hockey organization. Complimentary additions to the USPHL Premier included Elmira Jr. Enforcers, Provo Riverblades, and the return of the Wooster Oilers after a one-year absence.

During the 2019–20 season the Boston Bandits NCDC membership was purchased by the Philadelphia Hockey Club, to replace the Bandits in 2020–21. Rochester Monarchs were removed and replaced by Boston Advantage for the 2020–21 season.

For the 2022–23 season, several new teams joined the USPHL. The Mercer Chiefs joined the NCDC. The Bakersfield Roughnecks joined the Pacific Division in the USPHL Premier. The Idaho Falls Spud Kings joined the Mountain Division in the USPHL Premier. The Minnesota Squatch joined the Midwest West Division in the USPHL Premier.  Finally, several former teams from the WSHL—the Bellingham Blazers, Rock Springs Prospectors, Rogue Valley Royals, Seattle Totems, and Vernal Oilers—created a new North West Division in the USPHL Premier.

Member teams

National Collegiate Development Conference

Premier and Elite teams
The USPHL consists of Premier and Elite junior levels, as well as EHF Selects, EHF South, 18U, 16U, 15U, and High Performance youth divisions with organizations located across the United States.

Champions

Former teams
Adirondack Jr. Wings— (2013–15, Empire/16U/16U Futures Divisions) Team ceased operations prior to 2015–16 season; also fielded youth teams for one more season.
Alpena Flyers— (2014–17, Midwest/USP3 Divisions) Team ceased operations following the end of the 2016–17 season.
Anaheim Avalanche— (2020–21, Premier Division) Joined from the Western States Hockey League (WSHL) as the Ontario Avalanche in 2020 and relocated to Anaheim before their first USPHL season; purchased and relocated as the Long Beach Shredders for the 2021–22 season.
Atlanta Kings— (2018–19) Former Junior Knights organization. Ceased operations after the one 2018–19 season it played in Marietta, Georgia, and replaced by a new organization called the Atlanta Mad Hatters.
Atlanta Junior Knights— (2013–18) Joined from the Eastern Elite Hockey League. Moved to a new rink in Marietta, Georgia, and rebranded as the Atlanta Kings.
Bay State Breakers— (2013–15, Premier Division) Premier franchise sold to the Syracuse Stars organization; continues to field their Elite Division and youth teams for one more season.
Beijing Shougang Eagles (2017–2019; Elite Division) Chinese junior team that played out of East Meadow, New York 
Blaine Energy— (2015–17, Midwest/Elite Divisions) Formerly in the Minnesota Junior Hockey League as the Maple Grove Energy; ceased operations at the end of the 2016–17 season.
Boston Bandits— (2017–2020, NCDC) Joined from the Eastern Hockey League in 2017 when the NCDC was created; sold its NCDC franchise to the Philadelphia Hockey Club before the 2020–21 season. All other teams were renamed Bridgewater Bandits.
Brewster Bulldogs— (2013–15, Empire Division) Formerly in the Empire Junior Hockey League; continued to field their EHL 19U Elite team that was formerly in Metropolitan Junior Hockey League until 2016.
Buffalo Thunder— (2018–2021, Premier Division) Played as the Niagara Falls Thunder in the 2018–19 season before becoming the Buffalo Thunder in 2019; replaced by the Buffalo Stampede expansion team in 2021.
Charleston Colonials
Connecticut Nighthawks
Detroit Fighting Irish (??- 2022) (Premier-Midwest East) not in league listing 2022-23 season
Daytona Racers— (2015–18) Operated by the DME Academy, the Racers initially joined the USP3 Division; the Academy dropped the Racers name from its hockey team in the Premier Division in 2018 and were not in the league for 2019–20.
Eugene Generals— (2016–18, USP3/Elite Divisions) Joined the USP3 Division from the Northern Pacific Hockey League in 2016; only Pacific team remaining in the Elite Division in 2017–18 season leading the team to mostly playing an independent schedule while also retaining its USA Hockey-sanctioning when the USPHL went independent; left the league the following season.
Florida Bulldogs— (2013–15, Elite Division) Formerly called the Space Coast Jr. Hurricanes when the organization joined from the Eastern Elite Hockey League and for the 2013–14 USPHL season; merged with the Roswell Bulldogs organization in April 2014 and played under that name for the 2014–15 season; renamed Florida Bulldogs prior to the 2015–16 season but ceased operation due to lack of players after one game, an 8–2 loss to the Palm Beach Hawks.
Forest Lake Lakers— (2015–17, Midwest/Elite Divisions) Formerly in the Minnesota Junior Hockey League; team sold and renamed Minnesota Mullets after the 2016–17 season.
Frederick Freeze— (2013–16, Empire/USP3 Division) Formerly in the Empire Junior Hockey League, removed from USP3 schedule in September 2016.
Hartford Jr. Wolfpack— (2017–2019; Premier Division) Joined from the Eastern Hockey League in 2017; removed from the schedule at the beginning of the 2019–20 season.
Illiana Blackbirds— (2015–16, Midwest Division) Based out of Dyer, Indiana; joined from the Minnesota Junior Hockey League in 2015; merged into the Elite Division for 2016–17 but ceased operations prior to scheduling. Relisted as a team in the Premier Division for 2018–19 as the Midwest Blackbirds.
Indiana Attack— Announced team for 2015–16 season in the Midwest Division; formerly the Fort Wayne Federals of the Minnesota Junior Hockey League; canceled their opening night game against the Alpena Flyers one day before it was scheduled and ceased operations.
Ironwood Fighting Yoopers— (2016–18) Announced team for 2015–16 season in the Midwest Division; formerly in the Minnesota Junior Hockey League; took leave of absence prior to first season. The team returned as part of the USP3 in 2016–17, then the Premier Midwest in 2017–18. Sold franchise prior to 2018–19 season and became the Rum River Mallards.
Jersey Wildcats— (2013–15, Empire Division) Formerly in the Empire Junior Hockey League; continued to field a team in the North American 3 Atlantic Hockey League (formerly called the Metropolitan Junior Hockey League) from 2015 to 2017.
Jersey Shore Whalers— (2014–19 Empire/USP3/Premier Divisions) Joined the USPHL after several seasons as a youth organization; junior team removed from Premier schedule during the 2019–20 season. Returned for 2021–22 season. Not on league listing 2022-23 season.
Kalkaska Rhinos— (2015–18 Midwest/USP3/Premier Divisions) Joined the new Midwest Division in 2015 as an expansion team after playing a partial season in the Canadian International Hockey League in 2014–15. Moved to the USP3 Division in 2016–17 and the Premier Division in 2017–18. Cancelled all remaining games in January 2018 due to injuries and lack of players.
Lake Erie Bighorns— (2019-2022, Great Lakes Division)
Lansing Wolves— (2018–20, Premier Division) Formerly in the NA3HL, not listed as a member of the USPHL prior to the 2020–21 season.
Marquette Royales— (2015–16, Midwest Division) Formerly in the Minnesota Junior Hockey League, moved to the USP3 Division in 2016 but was removed from the schedule prior to the 2016–17 season.
Michigan Wild— (2015–16, Midwest Division) Joined from the Midwest Junior Hockey League as the Michigan Ice Dogs but were renamed the Wild prior to their first season in the USPHL; joined the USP3 Division in 2016 but were removed from the schedule less than one week before the start of the season.
Midwest Blackbirds— (2018-2022, Premier Midwest East) 
Minnesota Owls— Announced team for 2015–16 season in the Midwest Division; formerly in the Minnesota Junior Hockey League; took leave of absence prior to first season.
Motor City Hawks—  (2015–18, Midwest/USP3/Premier Division) Joined from the Midwest Junior Hockey League in 2015 and played in the Midwest Division. Joined the USP3 Division in 2016–17 and then the Premier Division in 2017–18. At the end of the 2017–18 season, the team re-branded to the Motor City Hockey Club and relocated to Troy, Michigan.
New York Apple Core— (2013–14, Empire Division) Formerly in the Empire Junior Hockey League; continues to field their Eastern Hockey League teams.
New York Aviators— (2013–15, Empire Division) The organization decided to play in the North American 3 Eastern Hockey League and the Empire franchise was reassigned to the New York Dragons. The Aviators returned to the USPHL with an Elite Division and youth teams in 2016. The former NA3EHL team became the Long Island Sharks in the North American 3 Hockey League.
New York Dragons— Announced team for the 2015–16 season in the USP3 Division with the franchise rights from the previous New York Aviators but appears to have dropped from the division prior to the season.
Okanagan European Eagles— (2015–17, Premier Division) A team based in Austria made up of European players. Left the league after two seasons.
Palm Beach Hawks— (2013–19, various junior and youth divisions) Joined from the EJHL South with members in the Elite and Empire Divisions in 2013. Both junior teams folded during the 2018–19 season.
Philadelphia Flyers Junior Hockey Club— (2013–17, Premier Division) An expansion team and founding member of the USPHL Premier. Sold to the Lightning Hockey Club and relocated to Newark, Delaware, in 2017. The Lightning HC were removed from the league prior to the start of the 2017–18 season.
Philadelphia Hockey Club— (2020–22, NCDC and Premier Divisions, joined EHL in 2022)
Pittsburgh Vengeance— (? - 2022, Premier Division)  A team based in Harmar Township, Pennsylvania that played in the Great Lakes division.
Portland Jr. Pirates— (2013–16, Premier/Elite/18U Divisions) Based out of Saco, Maine. Not listed by USPHL in 2016 but continues to operate youth hockey programs outside the USPHL umbrella.
Providence Capitals— (2014–16, Elite/18U/16U Divisions)
River Falls Renegades— (2016–17, Elite Division) Former SCV Magicians, were not listed in the league membership for 2017–18.
Rochester Jr. Americans— (2013–16, Premier/Elite/18U Divisions) Replaced by the Rochester Monarchs organization.
Rochester Monarchs– (2016–2017, Elite; 2017–2020, Premier; 2017–2020, NCDC) Member of the inaugural NCDC season; NCDC membership revoked by the USPHL for poor performance after the 2019–20 season and the organization decided to fold its Premier team as well.
Rochester Vipers
St. Croix Valley Magicians— (2015–16, Midwest Division) Joined as the Hudson Crusaders of Hudson, Wisconsin, from the Minnesota Junior Hockey League in 2015; rebranded prior to their first season in the USPHL and relocated mid-season to Vadnais Heights, Minnesota; relocated again in 2016 to become the River Falls Renegades in River Falls, Wisconsin.
Seattle Ravens— (2016–17, USP3 Division); Joined from the Northern Pacific Hockey League for the 2016–17 season; Left the league in 2017, rebranded as the Kent Ravens and joined the Western States Hockey League but folded prior to playing a game.
Skipjacks Hockey- (2017-2021, USPHL Premier)
Soo Firehawks— Announced team for 2015–16 season in the Midwest Division; formerly in the Midwest Junior Hockey League; ceased operations prior to first season.
Southern Oregon Spartans— (2020, Premier Division) Joined from the Western States Hockey League, but were forced to withdraw early into the 2020–21 season due to COVID-19 pandemic restrictions; opted out of the 2021–22 season as well.
Southern Tier Xpress— Announced team in the new Great Lakes division of the USPHL Premier for 2018–19 season after a move from the North American 3 Hockey League. The Tier II Philadelphia Rebels then relocated as the Jamestown Rebels and the Xpress returned their franchise to the league. The Xpress franchise was replaced by Lake Erie Bighorns franchise in the Great Lakes division.
 St. Louis Storm— Announced team for 2015–16 season in the Midwest Division; formerly the St. Louis Frontenacs of the Minnesota Junior Hockey League; ceased operations prior to first season.
 Syracuse Stars– (2015–19) The Premier team launched in 2015–16 with the purchase of the Bay State Breakers franchise. In 2019, the Stars merged with the Utica Jr. Comets organization and continued operations under that name.
Team Comcast— (2014–15, 18U/16U Divisions) Youth teams associated with the Philadelphia Flyers Junior Hockey Club. In March 2016, was renamed Virtua Hockey and joined the Atlantic Youth Hockey League. 
Traverse City Hounds— (2015–16, Midwest Division) Joined from the Midwest Junior Hockey League in 2015; renamed Traverse City North Stars after the former NAHL team in 2016.
Traverse City North Stars— (2016–17, USP3 Division) Went dormant prior to the 2017–18 season.
Tri-City Icehawks— (2015–19, Midwest/USP3/Premier Division) A Bay City, Michigan, team that joined from the Minnesota Junior Hockey League in the Midwest Division for 2015–16. Played their final USPHL season in the Premier Midwest East Division.
Tri-City Outlaws— (2016–17, USP3 Division) Joined from the Northern Pacific Hockey League for the 2016–17 season; not listed as a member of the USPHL for the 2017–18 season.
West Sound Warriors— (2016–17, USP3 Division) Joined from the Northern Pacific Hockey League for the 2016–17 season; suspended operations in 2017. The Vancouver Rangers of the WSHL relocated to Bremerton and became the West Sound Warriors for the 2017–18 season.
 Wisconsin Muskies— (2017–18, Premier Division) Played out of Spooner, Wisconsin; removed from team listing after one season and arena issues.
 Wooster Oilers— (2018-22, Great Lakes Division)

References

External links
Official USPHL website

3
2012 establishments in the United States
Sports leagues established in 2012